Columbia may refer to:

 Columbia (personification), the historical female national personification of the United States, and a poetic name for America

Places

North America

Natural features
 Columbia Plateau, a geologic and geographic region in the U.S. Pacific Northwest
 Columbia River, in Canada and the United States
 Columbia Bar, a sandbar in the estuary of the Columbia River
 Columbia Country, the region of British Columbia encompassing the northern portion of that river's upper reaches
Columbia Valley, a region within the Columbia Country
 Columbia Lake, a lake at the head of the Columbia River
 Columbia Wetlands, a protected area near Columbia Lake
 Columbia Slough, along the Columbia watercourse near Portland, Oregon
 Glacial Lake Columbia, a proglacial lake in Washington state
 Columbia Icefield, in the Canadian Rockies
 Columbia Island (District of Columbia), in the Potomac River
 Columbia Island (New York), in Long Island Sound

Populated places
 Columbia City (disambiguation)
 Columbia County (disambiguation)
 District of Columbia (disambiguation), including "Columbia District"
 Columbia Township (disambiguation)
 Mount Columbia (disambiguation)

Canada 
 British Columbia, a province of Canada
 Columbia District, a Hudson's Bay Company fur trading district in the Pacific Northwest
 Columbia, British Columbia, a former city in Canada
 Columbia (electoral district), formerly in British Columbia, Canada, 1903–1928
 Columbia Street, New Westminster, the main downtown street of that city, in British Columbia, Canada

United States 
 District of Columbia, the United States' capital district
 Columbia, Alabama, a town
 Columbia, Arizona, a populated place
 Columbia, California, a census-designated place and former boomtown
 Columbia, San Diego, California, a neighborhood
 Columbia, Connecticut, a town
 Columbia, Illinois, a city 
 Columbia, Fayette County, Indiana, an unincorporated town 
 Columbia, Iowa, an unincorporated community
 Columbia, Kentucky, a city
 Columbia, Louisiana, a town
 Columbia, Maine, a town
 Columbia, Maryland, a planned community
 Columbia, Michigan, a village
 Columbia, Mississippi, a city
 Columbia, Missouri, a city
 Columbia metropolitan area (Missouri)
 Columbia, New Hampshire, a town
 Columbia, New Jersey, a census-designated place
 Columbia, New York, a town
 Columbia, North Carolina, a town
 Columbia, Tuscarawas County, Ohio, an unincorporated community
 Columbia, Williams County, Ohio, an unincorporated community
 Columbia, Pennsylvania, a borough
 Columbia, South Carolina, the capital of South Carolina
 Columbia metropolitan area (South Carolina)
 Columbia, South Dakota, a city
 Columbia, Tennessee, a city
 Columbia, Virginia, a town
 Columbia (Richmond, Virginia), a historic home
 Camp Columbia (Hanford), Washington state, a prison camp during and after World War II
 Columbia, West Virginia
 Columbia, Wisconsin, an unincorporated community
 Columbia, former name of Romney, Indiana, an unincorporated community
 Columbia, former name of Etna, New York, an unincorporated community
 Columbia, former name of West Columbia, Texas, a city

Elsewhere
 Columbia, Queensland, a locality in Australia
 Camp Columbia (Wacol), Queensland, Australia, during World War II
 Columbia, Tyne and Wear, United Kingdom, a village subdivision of the town of Washington
 Columbia (supercontinent), a prehistoric supercontinent
 327 Columbia, an asteroid

Arts and media

Fictional elements
 Columbia (BioShock), a city in the video game BioShock Infinite
 Columbia, a character in the movie The Rocky Horror Picture Show

Music
 Columbia, a style of Cuban rumba
 Columbia: Live at Missouri University, a 1993 live album by American power pop group Big Star
 "Columbia", a song on the 1994 Oasis album Definitely Maybe
 "Columbia", a song on the 2000 Paul van Dyk album Out There and Back
 "Columbia", a song on the 2005 Eric Johnson album Bloom

Publications
 Columbia Encyclopedia, one-volume encyclopedia published by Columbia University Press
 Columbia: A Journal of Literature and Art, annual literary journal published by Columbia University
 Columbia Magazine, an alumni magazine published by Columbia University
Columbia: The Magazine of Northwest History, quarterly magazine published by the Washington State Historical Society
Columbia, a magazine published by the Knights of Columbus
Columbia Magazine, an online magazine published in Columbia, Kentucky

Companies

Arts and media companies
 Columbia Amusement Company, an American burlesque chain that operated from 1902 to 1927
 Columbia Artists Management
 Columbia Broadcasting System, original name of American broadcast network, CBS; initially Columbia Phonographic Broadcasting System (1927–1928), then Columbia Broadcasting System, Inc. (1928–1974), now CBS Inc. (1974–present)
 Columbia Comics
 Columbia Games
 Columbia Graphophone Company, a British record company and label from 1922 to 1973
 Columbia House, an American mail-order media company
 Nippon Columbia, formerly Columbia Music Entertainment, a Japanese record company
 Columbia Pictures, an American cinematic film studio founded in 1924, owned by Sony Corporation since 1989.
 Columbia Records, an American record label founded in 1888, owned since 1988 by Sony Music Entertainment
 Columbia University Press, affiliated with Columbia University and publisher of Columbia Encyclopedia

Transportation companies
 Columbia Aircraft, taken over by Cessna
 Columbia Aircraft Corporation, originally Columbia Air Liners Inc.
 Columbia Bicycles of Hartford, Connecticut
 Columbia (automobile brand) (1899–1913), originally expanded from the bicycle line
 Columbia Helicopters, based in Aurora, Oregon
 Columbia Motors of Detroit, Michigan (1917–1924)
 Columbia Railway, a historic Washington, D.C. streetcar company
 Columbia Transit (COMO Connect), a bus company serving Columbia, Missouri
 Columbia Transportation, the university bus system of Columbia University

Other companies
 Columbia Brewery in Canada
 Columbia Data Products
 Columbia Forest Products
 Columbia Gas Transmission, a gas pipeline between the U.S. Gulf Coast and New York
 Columbia Industries
 Columbia Insurance Group
 Columbia Management Group
 Columbia Mining Company, amalgamated in 2001 with Teck Resources as Teck-Cominco
 Columbia Power Corporation, Canada
 Columbia Sportswear, formerly the Columbia Hat Company

People
 Al Columbia (born 1970), American artist, writer and cartoonist
 Columbia Lancaster (1803–1893), a delegate from the Territory of Washington

Schools 
 Columbia University, New York City
 Columbia Lions, athletic teams representing the university
 Columbia International University, Columbia, South Carolina
 Columbia College (disambiguation)
 Columbia Bible College, Abbotsford, British Columbia
 Columbia Theological Seminary, formerly in Columbia, now in Decatur, Georgia
 Columbia Grammar & Preparatory School, New York City
 Columbia High School (disambiguation)
 Columbia Independent School, Columbia, Missouri
 Columbia Middle School in Grovetown, Georgia
 Columbia University, a former name of the University of Portland

School districts
 Columbia Elementary School District, Redding, California
 Columbia School District (Mississippi)
 Columbia Public Schools, Columbia, Missouri

Aircraft and spacecraft
 Space Shuttle Columbia
 Command Module Columbia, the Command/Service Module for the Apollo 11 mission
 Columbia XJL, a large amphibian aircraft built only as three prototypes

Ships

Naval vessels
 USS Columbia, any of several ships of the US Navy
 Columbia-class cruiser, a group of two protected cruisers used by the United States Navy, 1890–91
 CSS Columbia, a Confederate (and later U.S. Navy) ironclad ram during the Civil War
 HMCS Columbia, any of several commissioned vessels of the Royal Canadian Navy

America's Cup yachts
Columbia (1871 yacht)
Columbia (1899 yacht)
Columbia (1958 yacht)

Other ships
 Columbia (Arrow Lakes sternwheeler)
 Columbia (barque), in the service of the Hudson's Bay Company on the Columbia River and along the Pacific Northwest Coast
 Columbia (collapsed paddle steamer), a paddle steamer excursion boat which sank on the Illinois River in July 1918
 Columbia (sidewheeler 1850), a steamboat in Oregon
 MV Columbia, a large passenger and automobile ferry in the Alaska Marine Highway System fleet
 SS Columbia, a historic excursion steamer docked in Ecorse, Michigan, United States
 SS Columbia (1880), a coastal passenger liner which made the first commercial use of Edison's light bulb
 SS Columbia (1889), an ocean liner, later renamed Rapido, a cruiser for the Spanish Navy
 United States lightship Columbia (WLV-604), the first lightship on the Pacific Coast of the United States, docked in Astoria, Oregon
 Columbia Rediviva, commonly known as the Columbia, a maritime fur trade vessel

Other uses
 Columbia Carousel, carousels in amusement parks
 Columbia sheep, an American breed
 Columbia (supercomputer), named for the space shuttle
 Columbia, another name for the 2-4-2 classification of steam locomotives
 Sailing Ship Columbia, a themed ride at Disneyland
 Team Columbia, a professional cycling team sponsored by Columbia Sportswear
 Columbia (Hewlett-Packard), a codename for the HP OmniGo 700LX palmtop PC

See also

 
 
 Miss Columbia (disambiguation)
 Columbia Center (disambiguation)
 Columbia Mall (disambiguation)
 Columbia TriStar (disambiguation)
 Colombia (disambiguation)
 Colombian (disambiguation)
 Colombiana (disambiguation)
 Colombo (disambiguation)
 Columba (disambiguation)
 Columbiad, a type of large-caliber cannon from the 19th century
 Columbian (disambiguation)
 Columbiana (disambiguation)
 Columbus (disambiguation)
 Columba, saint
 Columbanus, saint
 Columbium, former name for the element Niobium